Muborak District is a district of Qashqadaryo Region in Uzbekistan. The capital lies at the city Muborak. The district consists of one city (Muborak), 5 urban-type settlements (Qarliq, Baxt, Qoraqum, Diyonat, Shayx) and 4 rural communities.

References

Qashqadaryo Region
Districts of Uzbekistan